Meizonyx is an extinct genus of megalonychid ground sloth from the Pleistocene of El Salvador and southern Mexico. The type and only species, Meizonyx salvadorensis, was described in 1985 from a mandible found in Barranca del Sisimico and other remains found at Rio Tomayate in El Salvador considered to be Middle Pleistocene in age. Later, in 2021, additional remains were described from Late Pleistocene aged deposits in Sistema Huautla, Oxaca, Mexico. It is considered closely related to Xibalbaonyx.

References 

Prehistoric sloths
Pleistocene xenarthrans
Prehistoric placental genera
Holocene extinctions
Rancholabrean
Pleistocene Mexico
Fossils of Mexico
Fossil taxa described in 1985